Timur Oruz (born 27 October 1994) is a German field hockey player who plays as a midfielder or forward for Rot-Weiss Köln and the German national team.

His sister Selin Oruz is also a field hockey player for the national team.

International career
Oruz represented his country at the 2016 Summer Olympics, where he won the bronze medal. On 28 May 2021, he was named in the squads for the 2021 EuroHockey Championship and the 2020 Summer Olympics.

Club career
Oruz started playing hockey at the age of four at Crefelder HTC. In 2013 he left Crefelder HTC for Uhlenhorst Mülheim. After one season he returned to his club in Krefeld and in 2015 he moved to his current club Rot-Weiss Köln.

References

External links
 
 
 

1994 births
Living people
German people of Turkish descent
German male field hockey players
Male field hockey midfielders
Male field hockey forwards
Field hockey players at the 2016 Summer Olympics
Field hockey players at the 2020 Summer Olympics
Olympic field hockey players of Germany
Olympic bronze medalists for Germany
Olympic medalists in field hockey
Medalists at the 2016 Summer Olympics
HTC Uhlenhorst Mülheim players
Rot-Weiss Köln players
Sportspeople from Krefeld
2023 Men's FIH Hockey World Cup players